Melloina is a genus of baldlegged spiders that was first described by Paolo Marcello Brignoli in 1985.  it contains only three species, found only in Panama and Venezuela: M. gracilis, M. rickwesti, and M. santuario.

See also
 List of Paratropididae species

References

Mygalomorphae genera
Paratropididae
Spiders of Central America
Spiders of South America